A shire is a type of regional division in the United Kingdom and other English-speaking nations.

It may also refer to:

Places

UK
 Four Shire Stone, where four English counties once met each other
 Shire Brook, in South Yorkshire, England
 Shire Country Park, a park south of Birmingham, England
 The Shires, a collective term for  Leicestershire, Rutlandshire and Northamptonshire: Midland English counties famous for fox-hunting

US
 Shires of Virginia, local government units in the U.S. state
 The Shire or New Hampshire, informal designation of the U.S. state

Other
 Shire, Ethiopia, a town and a district in Tigray region
 Shire, Mawal, a village in Mawal taluka, Pune district, Maharashtra, India
 Shire Highlands, a plateau in southern Malawi east of the Shire River
 Shire River, a river in Malawi and Mozambique
 Apostolic Vicariate of Shire, a Roman Catholic territorial jurisdiction in what was then Nyasaland Protectorate (now Malawi)
 The Shire or Sutherland Shire, a suburban region of southern Sydney, Australia

Buildings 

 Shire Hall, Monmouth, Wales, a building
 Shire Hall, Newport, Wales, a building

Enterprises 

 Shire Books, a British publisher of books on history, heritage and antiques
 Shire Foods, a manufacturer of pies, pasties, and sausage rolls based in Warwickshire, England
 Shire (pharmaceutical company), a British speciality pharmaceuticals company

Literature 

 The Shire, a region in J. R. R. Tolkien's Middle-earth legendarium
 The Shires, poetry collection by Donald Davie 1974

Music 

 The Shires (duo), a British country music duo
 The Shire (soundtrack), part of the soundtrack of The Fellowship of the Ring

Names 

 Shire (name), a traditional Somali name, including a list of people with the name
 Shires (surname), including a list of people with the name

Shopping centres 

 The Shires, former name of the English shopping centre now known as Highcross Leicester
 The Shires Shopping Centre in Trowbridge, Wiltshire, England

Other uses 

 Battle of Shire, a 1936 battle of the Second Italo-Abyssinian War
 East Stirlingshire F.C. or the Shire, a Scottish football club
 Shire horse, a large breed of draft horse
 The Shire (TV series), an Australian reality television series

See also 

 Shier, a surname
 Shyer, a surname